Raphael Malcolm Kaplinsky (born 31 December 1946) is a professorial fellow, Science Policy Research Unit, and emeritus professorial fellow, Institute of Development Studies, University of Sussex.

Early life 
Kaplinsky's father Morris and his wife, who were both Polish Jews, migrated from the town of Slonim (then in Poland, now in Belarus), to South Africa in 1929. As a student Kaplinsky took part in Cape Town University's Mafeje affair protests which resulted in him having to flee South Africa to the United Kingdom in the 1960s.

Personal life 
Kaplinsky married Catherine Charlewood, a psychoanalyst. They have a daughter, Natasha Kaplinsky, a TV presenter (born 1972) and a son, Benjamin Kaplinsky, a lawyer (born 1975).

Selected bibliography

Books 
 
 
 
 

 
 
 
 
 
 
 
 Kaplinsky, Raphael and Farooki, Masuma (2011). How China Disrupted Global Commodities: The Reshaping of the World’s Resource Sector. Routledge studies in global competition. London: Routledge.

Chapters in books 
 Kaplinsky, Raphael (1965), "Comparative advantage by design", in 
 
 
  Details.
  Pdf.
  Details. Pdf.
  Pdf.
  Pdf.
 
 
 
  Pdf.
 Kaplinsky, Raphael (2011), "Innovation for pro-poor growth: from redistribution with growth to redistribution through growth", in 
 Kaplinsky, Raphael (2011), "What contribution can China make to inclusive growth in SSA?", in 
 
Kaplinsky, Raphael and Morris, Mike (2012), "The structure of supply chains and their implications for export supply" in D. A. Ajakaiye and T. A. Ojeyide (eds.), Trade, Infrastructure and Development, London: Routledge.
Kaplinsky, Raphael and Morris, Mike (2012), "Chinese Overseas FDI in Sub-Saharan Africa", in I. Alon, M. Fetscherin and P. Gugler (eds.), Chinese International Investments, Basingstoke, Palgrave Macmillan (Foreword by P. Buckley)
Kaplinsky, Raphael (2013), "Past innovation trajectories in Latin America and current innovation trajectories in China" inG. Dutrénit, K. Lee, O. Vera-Cruz and R. Nelson (eds), Learning, capability building and development, EADI Global Development Series, Palgrave MacMillan, pp. 263–281.
Kaplinsky, Raphael (2014), "Walking (Stumbling?) on Two Legs: Meeting SSA’s Industrialization Challenge", in J. E. Stiglitz, J. Yifu Lin and E. Patel (eds.), The Industrial Policy Revolution II, International Econoic Association, London: Macmillan.
Kaplinsky, Raphael (2014), "Shudder: The Challenges to Industrial Policies in the early 21st Century in Low- and Middle-Income Economies" in R. Van Tulder, A. Verbeke and R. Strange (eds.), International Business and Sustainable Development, European International Business Association Vol. 8 Progress in International Business Research, Bingley, UK: Emerald Publishing.
 
Kaplinsky, Raphael (2014), ’Bottom of the pyramid Innovation’ and pro-poor growth in M.A. Dutz, Y. Kuznetsov, E. Lasagabaster and D. Pilat (eds.), Making Innovation Policy Work: Learning from Experimentation, Paris and New York: OECD and The World Bank.
Kaplinsky, Raphael (2016), "Global Value Chains, Where they came from, where they are going and why this is important" in J. Weiss and M. Tribe (eds.), Handbook on Industrial Development, Abingdon: Routledge
Kaplinsky, Raphael and M. Farooki (2017), "Raul Prebisch and the terms of trade; How things have changed…." in M. E. Margulis (ed), The Global Political Economy of Raul Prebisch, London: Routledge
Kaplinsky, Raphael (2019), "Technology for Sustainable Development" in Machiko Nissanke and Jose Antonio Ocampo (eds.), The Palgrave Handbook of Development Economics: Critical Reflections on Globalisation and Development, London: Palgrave Macmillan.
Kaplinsky, Raphael (2019), "Rent and inequality in global value chains" in S.Ponte, F. Gereffi and G. Raj-Reichert (eds.), Handbook on Global Value Chains, Cheltenham: Edward Elgar.

Journal articles 
  Pdf.
 
 
 
 
  Pdf.
  Pdf.
 
 
 
 
 
 
 
 
 
 
  Pdf.
  Pdf.
  Pdf.
  Pdf.
 
 
  Pdf.
  Pdf.
  Economic and Social Research Council version, pdf.
  World Bank pdf.
  Open University version, pdf.
 
 
 
Kaplinsky, R. (2013), "What Contribution Can China Make to Inclusive Growth in Sub-Sahara Development and Growth?", Development and Change, 46(6), pp. 1–22.
  PDF.
 Kaplinsky, R. and M. Morris (2015), "Thinning and Thickening: Productive Sector Policies in the Era of Global Value Chains", European Journal of Development Studies, pp. 1–21, doi:10.1057/ejdr.2015.29.
 Hanlin, R. and R. Kaplinsky (2016), "South–South Trade in Capital Goods – The Market-Driven Diffusion of Appropriate Technology", European Journal of Development Research, pp. 1–18, doi:10.1057/ejdr.2016.18.
 Kaplinsky, Raphael and M. Morris (2018), "Standards, regulation and sustainable development in a global value chain driven world", International Journal of Technological Learning, Innovation and Development, vol. 10, no. 3/4, pp. 322–346.
 Davis, D., R. Kaplinsky and M. Morris (2018), "Rents, Power and Governance in Global Value Chains", Journal of World-Systems Research, 2018, vol. 24, no. 1.

Papers 
 International Labour Office (ILO), United Nations, Geneva, Switzerland
 
  Pdf.
 
 Institute of Development Studies (IDS), University of Sussex
 
 
  Pdf.
  Pdf.
  Pdf.
  Pdf.
  Pdf.
 
 United Nations Industrial Development Organization (UNIDO), Vienna, Austria
 Pdf.
  Pdf.
 
 The Intellectual History of UNIDO: Building Ideas from Data and Practice. Vienna, Austria: United Nations Industrial Development Organization (UNIDO).
Kaplinsky, Raphael and Morris, Mike (2014). Developing Industrial Clusters and Supply Chains to Support Diversification and Sustainable Development of Exports in Africa,Cairo: African Export Import Bank.
 Kaplinsky, Raphael (2015), "Technological Upgrading in Global Value Chains and Clusters and their Contribution to Sustaining Economic Growth in Low and Middle Income Economies". Inclusive and Sustainable Industrial Development Working Paper Series, WP 03/2015. Vienna: United Nations Industrial Development Organization.
 Kaplinsky, Raphael (2015), "Technological upgrading in global value chains and clusters and their contribution to sustaining economic growth in low and middle income economies". UNIDO/UNU‐MERIT background papers for the UNIDO, Industrial Development Report 2016: IDR 2016 WP 3.
Greening Africa's Industrialization: Economic Report on Africa, 2016, United Nations Economic Commission for Africa.
Open University
 Pdf.
 Pdf.
 Pdf.
 Pdf.
See also 
See also  (Based on the MMCP research papers.)
Chataway, J., R. E. Hanlin and R. Kaplinsky (2013), "Inclusive Development: An Architecture for Policy Development", IKD Working Paper 65, Milton Keynes: The Open University.
Kaplinsky, Raphael and Morris, Mike (2014), "Thinning and Thickening: Productive Sector Policies in the Era of Global Value Chains", IKD Discussion Paper No. 74, Milton Keynes, Open University
World Bank
 Pdf.
 Pdf.
 Pdf.
 Pdf.
Sanjaya Lall Programme for Technology and Management for Development (SLPTMD), Department of International Development, University of Oxford
 Pdf.
Kaplinsky, Raphael, and Morris, Mike (2001) A Handbook for Value Chain Research. http://www.prism.uct.ac.za/papers/vchnov01.pdf
Morris, M., R. Kaplinsky and D. Kaplan (2011), A Conceptual Overview to Understand Commodities, Linkages and Industrial Development in Africa, Prepared for Africa Export Import Bank.
Kaplinsky, Raphael (2012), "Walking (stumbling?) On two legs: meeting SSA's industrialisation challenge", Paper presented to International Economic Association Conference on Industrialisation in Africa, July 2012, Pretoria.
Kaplinsky, Raphael (2012), "China’s impact on commodity prices", ThisisAfricaOnline.com,http://www.thisisafricaonline.com/News/China-s-impact-on-commodity-prices
Adeoti, J., R. Kemp, J. Ndichu, A. E. Obayelu, J. Blohmke, R. Kaplinsky and K. Urama (2013), "Diffusion strategy of green technology and green industry in Africa. A study of renewable energy technology market, and energy efficiency adoption in Cassava and Maize processing industries in Kenya and Nigeria", Final report of study for KEEI and UNIDO, Maastricht: United Nations University.
Kaplinsky. Raphael (2013),Infrastructure Development within the Context of Africa's Cooperation with New And Emerging Development Partners, Report Prepared For The United Nations Office Of The Special Adviser On Africa, N. York: Office for the Special Adviser on Africa, United Nations.
Kaplinsky, Raphael, and Morris, Mike. (2014). Developing Industrial Clusters and Supply Chains to Support Diversification and Sustainable Development of Exports in Africa. Cairo: African Export Import Bank.
Kemp, R., J. A. Adeoti, J. Ndichu, A. E. Obayelu, J. Blohmke, R. Kaplinsky and K. Urama (2014), "Innovation policy for eco-innovation in developing countries in Africa", Paper presented to Lundvall symposium "Innovation policy – can it make a difference?", Utzon Center, Aalborg, Denmark,13‐14 March.
Kaplinsky, Raphael (2016), "The End of Industrial Policy? Why a Productive Sector Policy Agenda Better Meets the Needs of Sustainable Income Growth", Commonwealth Secretariat Policy Briefing Paper.
Kaplinsky, Raphael (2016), Inclusive and Sustainable Growth: The SDG Value Chains Nexus, Framework Paper, International Centre for Trade and Sustainable Development, Geneva.
Kaplinsky, Raphael (2018), Fostering inclusive innovation for sustainable development,Pathways for Prosperity Commission Background Paper Series; no. 9. Oxford: United Kingdom, https://pathwayscommission.bsg.ox.ac.uk/Raphael-Kaplinsky-paper

References

External links 
 Raphael Kaplinsky at the University of Sussex
 Raphie Kaplinsky personal webpage

Living people
1946 births
South African Jews
South African people of Belarusian-Jewish descent
Academics of the Open University
Academics of the University of Sussex
People in international development
University of Cape Town alumni